Duisburg I is an electoral constituency (German: Wahlkreis) represented in the Bundestag. It elects one member via first-past-the-post voting. Under the current constituency numbering system, it is designated as constituency 115. It is located in the Ruhr region of North Rhine-Westphalia, comprising the southern part of the city of Duisburg.

Duisburg I was created for the inaugural 1949 federal election. Since 2009, it has been represented by Bärbel Bas of the Social Democratic Party (SPD).

Geography
Duisburg I is located in the Ruhr region of North Rhine-Westphalia. As of the 2021 federal election, it comprises the southern part of the independent city of Duisburg, specifically the Stadtbezirke of Rheinhausen and Süd, as well as Mitte excluding the Stadtteil of Duissern.

History
Duisburg I was created in 1949. In the 1949 election, it was North Rhine-Westphalia constituency 33 in the numbering system. From 1953 through 1961, it was number 92. From 1965 through 1976, it was number 90. From 1980 through 1998, it was number 84. From 2002 through 2009, it was number 116. Since 2013, it has been number 115.

Originally, the constituency comprised the area of Duisburg north of the Ruhr except for the Stadtteile of Laar and Ruhrort. From 1965 through 1976, it comprised the area of Duisburg north of the Ruhr. From 1980 through 2009, it comprised the Stadtbezirke of Mitte, Rheinhausen, and Süd. In the 2013 election, it lost the Stadtteil of Duissern.

Members
The constituency has been held by the Social Democratic Party (SPD) during all but two Bundestag terms since 1949. It was first represented by Eberhard Brünen of the SPD for a single term from 1949, before Leo Storm of the Christian Democratic Union (CDU) won it in 1953. He was re-elected in 1957. Former member Brünen regained it for the SPD in 1961, and served a further three terms. Günter Schluckebier served two terms from 1972 to 1980, when he was succeeded by Helmut Wieczorek, who was representative until 2002. Petra Weis held the seat from 2002 to 2009. Bärbel Bas was elected in 2009, and re-elected in 2013, 2017, and 2021.

Election results

2021 election

2017 election

2013 election

2009 election

References

Federal electoral districts in North Rhine-Westphalia
1949 establishments in West Germany
Constituencies established in 1949
Duisburg